The Battle of the Kamenets–Podolsky pocket (or Hube Pocket) was part of the larger Soviet Proskurov–Chernovtsy offensive (Russian: Проскуровско-Черновицкая Операция, Proskurovsko-Chernovitskaya Operatsiya), whose main goal was to envelop the Wehrmacht's 1st Panzer Army of Army Group South. The envelopment occurred in late March 1944 on the Eastern Front during the Dnieper–Carpathian offensive. It was the biggest and most important operation of the Dnieper–Carpathian offensive.

The Red Army successfully created a pocket, trapping some 220,000 German soldiers inside. Under the command of General Hans-Valentin Hube and with the direction of Field Marshal Erich von Manstein, the majority of German forces in the pocket were able to fight their way out by mid-April in coordination with the German relief forces led by the 2nd SS Panzer Corps, which was transferred from France with just months before the Allied D-Day landings.

Although the majority of the 1st Panzer Army was rescued, it came at the cost of losing almost the entire heavy equipment and a significant territory while many divisions ended up being shattered formations, which required thorough refitting.

This Soviet offensive and the ongoing crisis had absorbed all German strategic reserves that could otherwise be used to repel the future Allied D-Day landings or Soviet Operation Bagration. All told, 9 infantry and 2 panzer divisions, 1 heavy panzer battalion and 2 assault gun brigades with a total strength of 127,496 troops and 363 tanks/assault guns were transferred from across France, Germany, Denmark, Poland, Balkans to the Ukraine between March–April 1944. In total, the German forces stationed in France were deprived of a total of 45,827 troops and 363 tanks, assault guns, and self-propelled anti-tank guns on 6 June 1944.

Although the Soviets were unable to destroy the 1st Panzer Army, they did achieve major operational goals. With the Soviet 1st Tank Army crossing the Dniester river and reaching Chernivtsi near the Carpathian Mountains, the 1st Panzer Army's links with the 8th Army in the south had been cut off. As a result, Army Group South was effectively split into two – north and south of Carpathians. The northern portion was renamed to Army Group North Ukraine, while the southern portion to Army Group South Ukraine, which was effective from 5 April 1944, although very little of Ukraine remained in German hands. For the Wehrmacht defeat, the commander of Army Group South Erich von Manstein was dismissed by Hitler and replaced by Walter Model.

As a result of this split, the Soviets had cut the main supply lifeline of Army Group South, the Lviv–Odessa railway. Now, the southern group of German forces would have to use the long roundabout route through the Balkans, with all of the supplies being rerouted over the Romanian railroads, which were in poor condition.

Background

Throughout February, main forces of the 1st Ukrainian Front repulsed heavy blows from the units of the 1st Panzer Army in their attempts to de-blockade the trapped German forces at the Korsun-Cherkassy Pocket.

At the same time, the right wing of the 1st Ukrainian Front had executed the Rovno–Lutsk offensive, spearheaded by 2 Cavalry Corps. In the course of that operation, a new bulge was created, in which the Soviets dangerously hanged from the north over the 1st Panzer Army and the rest of the Army Group South in Ukraine.

It would be there, in the Shepetivka area, where Soviets will shift their main weight of attack. By striking south from that area towards the Dniester river, the 1st Panzer Army and all German forces operating in the right-bank Ukraine would be cut off from Germany and pressed against the Carpathian Mountains.

Furthermore, the Ternopil–Khmelnytskyi railway junction, which was part of a wider Lviv–Odessa railway, was a major German communication and supply center that linked together northern and southern portions of Army Group South. It was also the last railroad before the Carpathian Mountains. If this railroad was cut, the southern group of German forces would have to use the long roundabout route through the Balkans, with all of the supplies being rerouted over the Romanian railroads, which were in poor condition.

Soviet preparations 
On 18 February 1944, immediately after the end of the Battle of the Korsun-Cherkassy Pocket, the 1st Ukrainian Front received the task of carrying out a new offensive operation, which is known as the Proskurov-Chernovtsy Operation.

The 1st Ukrainian Front front had at its disposal the 13th, 60th, 1st Guards, 18th and 38th Combined-Arms Armies, 3rd Guards, 1st and 4th Tank Armies, 2nd Air Army, 4th Guards and 25th Tank Corps, 1st and 6th Guards Cavalry Corps.

The directive of the Supreme High Command (STAVKA) for this operation stated:
"To prepare an offensive with the inclusion in the composition of the strike group of the front the troops of the 13th, 60th, 1st Guards Armies, 3rd Guards and 4th Tank Armies. To launch an attack from the front of Dubno, Shepetovka, Lyubar in a southerly direction with the task of smashing the German grouping in the area of Kremenets, Starokonstantinov, Tarnopol and seizing Berestechko, Brody, Tarnopol, Proskurov, Khmilniki areas. In the future, to advance in the general direction on Chortkov, in order to cut off the southern group of German forces the withdrawal paths westward in the area north of the Dniester river."

In the final form, the plan of the operation saw the main attack to be launched by the forces of the 13th, 60th, 1st Guards Combined-Arms Armies, 3rd Guards and 4th Tank Armies from the front of Torgovitsa, Shepetivka, Lyubar to the south in the general direction on Brody, Ternopil, Chortkiv, Khmelnytskyi. Secondary attacks were to be delivered by the 18th and 38th armies towards the Khmilnyk, Zhmerynka and Vinnytsia areas.

During the preparation of the operation, large re-grouping of the troops was carried out. Throughout the February 1944, the 1st Ukrainian Front participated in the Korsun-Shevchenkovsky Operation. Therefore, a significant number of front-line troops of the 1st Ukrainian Front by mid-February were on its left wing. The new operation required the creation of a strong strike force closer to the right wing. It was necessary to transfer the 3rd Guards Tank Army and a significant number of artillery, tank, engineering units from the Berdychiv area to the Shumsk region, to regroup the 60th and 1st Guards armies almost completely into their new lines, and also to move the 18th and 38th armies to the right wing as well. Meanwhile, the 4th Tank Army had to advance 350 kilometers from the area west of Kiev.

The huge transfer of forces 200–350 km westwards, through the deep spring mud or rasputitsa, as well as destroyed landscape, was extremely challenging. By the beginning of the operation, it was not possible to create the necessary fuel reserves. On the eve of the attack, fuel stocks for tank units dropped alarmingly to less than 3 day's supply. Despite this, Zhukov and the front command decided to launch the operation, as the mudslide intensified more and more, and every day of respite gave the Germans time to recover. It was taken into account that the additional amount of fuel would go to the troops on the 3rd or 4th day of the operation. However, the fuel and ammunition shortages would be a recurring issue.

The STAVKA and the front command paid great attention to ensuring the secrecy of the preparations- the Maskirovka. For this, a limited circle of people was involved in the development of a plan of operation, the telephone conversations on issues related to the upcoming operation were strictly forbidden. All troop movements were carried out at night or in daytime in conditions of poor visibility with the strictest camouflage measures. For the purpose of misinforming the Germans and misleading them regarding the true direction of the main attack, the concentration of rifle and tank forces was imitated in the 38th Army's sector and rumors about a large-scale offensive in the area were spread through the local population. All these measures had a positive effect: they ensured a surprise of the strike on the tactical level and forced the Germans to hold significant forces against the 18th and 38th armies.

All told, on the eve of the attack on 4 March 1944, on the 400 km front, the 1st Ukrainian Front numbered 646,842 combat troops, 11,221 artillery guns and mortars, 1,409 tanks and self-propelled guns, and 477 aircraft.

German preparations 
The Soviet 1st Ukrainian Front was opposed by the Wehrmacht's 1st and 4th Panzer Armies, belonging to Army Group South. It consisted of a total of 25 divisions (including 10 panzer and panzer-grenadier divisions), a motorized brigade, 2 heavy panzer battalions, 5 brigades of StuG assault guns, 2 consolidated groups and a large number of police, paramilitary, artillery, engineering, security and other units. These troops were supported by the 8th Air Corps of the Luftflotte 4.

The command of Army Group South watched with great concern the situation on its left flank, in the sector west of Lutsk, Shepetivka, which it considered, not without reason, one of the most vulnerable in its defense. The strike of the Soviet forces in this area to the south had very serious consequences- all German troops operating in Right-Bank Ukraine could have been cut off from the central regions of Germany and pressed against the Carpathian Mountains.

At the end of February 1944, when, in the opinion of the Germans, the danger of such an attack from the Soviet troops became particularly real, the German High Command took measures to strengthen the defense on the adjacent flanks of the 1st and 4th Panzer Armies. To this end, the troops of the 59th Army Corps and the 24th Tank Corps, defending in the area from Izyaslav to Ilintsy, were transferred from the 4th to the 1st Panzer Army, as a result of which the front of the 4th Panzer Army was significantly reduced.

But more important was the transfer of 5 panzer divisions (1st, 6th, 16th, 17th Panzer Divisions, 1st SS Panzer Division Leibstandarte SS Adolf Hitler) from the Uman direction to the area south of Yampol, Starokostiantyniv, the 7th Panzer Division from Dubno, the 357th and 359th Infantry Divisions from the reserve of the OKH in Germany and the 68th Infantry Division from Poland after refitting (badly damaged during the Zhitomir–Berdichev offensive). The Soviet intelligence was unable to detect this German regrouping in a timely manner. The appearance of six new German panzer divisions was discovered by the 1st Ukrainian Front only in the course of the operation that had already begun.

All told, on the eve of the Soviet attack on 4 March 1944, the German forces numbered 314,066 troops, 449 tanks, assault guns and self-propelled guns, some of which were in temporary repair, and 245 armoured personnel carriers. The 1st Panzer Army itself had 43 tanks and 50 assault guns. In addition, there were over 150 armored vehicles that were in the long term repair as a result of the damage sustained during the Battle of the Korsun-Cherkassy Pocket. Despite this, the 1st and 4th Panzer armies were the most powerful formations of Manstein's Army Group South.

1st phase of the operation: 4–21 March 1944

Main direction: Battle of the Tarnopol-Proskurov railroad 
At 8 am on 4 March 1944, after massive artillery bombardment, the troops of the Soviet 60th and 1st Guards armies went on the offensive. Infantry and tanks broke through the first line of German fortifications. To develop success in the 60th Army's sector, the 4th and 3rd Guards Tank Armies were introduced.

In the first two days of the offensive, the troops of the shock group of the 1st Ukrainian Front overcame the German defenses on the 180-kilometer front and advanced 25 to 50 km. During the initial advance, the Soviet troops did not simply push the Germans back, but intercepted their escape routes. A group of German troops was surrounded and defeated in the area of Mokeevtsy (12 km south of Shepetivka), while under Teofipol (20 km south-east of Yampol), the Soviet units had surrounded and destroyed the German infantry regiment.

By the end of 10 March, the troops of the main front grouping had advanced 70–80 km.
The 28th Rifle Corps of the Soviet 60th Army fought battles against the German 357th Infantry Division, which had arrived from the reserve in Germany, and the Prutzmann police group east of Zalozhtsy. The 15th Rifle and 4th Guards Tank Corps of the 60th Army advanced to the approaches of Ternopil and on 9 March they started fighting for the city, where the Germans brought up parts of the 68th and 359th Infantry Divisions that arrived from Germany. The 23rd and 18th Guards Rifle Corps of the 60th Army, together with the troops of the 4th Tank Army, fought fierce battles in the Volochysk area with units of the 7th Panzer Division and the 1st SS Panzer Division Leibstandarte SS Adolf Hitler.

By 11 March, the troops of the 3rd Guards Tank Army advanced into the Chernyy Ostrov area, enveloping the Khmelnytskyi group of the Germans from the west. At the same time, the 1st Guards Army, developing an offensive from the Labun and Brazhentsy areas, on 9 March, with the assistance of the 7th Guards Tank Corps of the 3rd Guards Tank Army, captured Starokonstantinov and started fighting on the approaches to Proskurov, where the Germans brought significant reinforcements.

The 18th Army, having launched the offensive on 5 March, by the end of 10 March had advanced from 20 to 30 km and started fighting for Khmilnyk. On 11 March, the 38th Army began the attack, advancing 4–8 km in a day.

With a powerful blow launched at the junction of the 4th and 1st Panzer Armies, the Soviet troops tore open a 145-kilometer gap between these two armies and had cut the Lviv–Odessa railway, a key German supply artery and communication center, in the area of Ternopil–Proskurov.

The Germans, attaching great importance to the retention of this key railway junction, and the cities of Tarnopol and Proskurov, had put up a fierce resistance against the advancing Soviet troops- In the area from Tarnopol to Proskurov, the Germans had concentrated 9 panzer divisions (1st, 6th, 11th, 7th, 8th, 16th, 17th, 19th Panzer Divisions, 1st SS Panzer Division Leibstandarte SS Adolf Hitler), 3 infantry divisions that arrived from Germany (68th, 357th, 359th Infantry Divisions) and 2 StuG Assault Gun brigades (311th and 322nd) that arrived from France. Starting from 7 March, the German troops, panzer divisions foremost, began to launch counterattacks, seeking, at any cost, to push back from the railway the units of the 1st Ukrainian Front. A ferocious battle broke out between both sides across the entire front. running from Ternopil to Khmelnytskyi.

The ferocity of fighting in this area was noted by Zhukov in his memoirs. In them, he wrote that:

"On March 7, a ferocious battle broke out here, the ferocity of which was not seen since the Battle of Kursk. For 8 days the enemy was trying to push our troops back to their starting position."

By 10 March, the general advance of the Soviet troops in the main direction had stopped. This was caused by the increased resistance of the Germans and the great difficulties of operating in the conditions of the spring thaw- rasputitsa. Tanks, artillery and vehicles moved with great difficulty. Sometimes ammunition had to be brought by foot, while fuel for tank forces was delivered by aircraft.

Between 10 and 20 March, both the Soviets and the Germans fought grueling battles against one another at the Tarnopol-Proskurov railway junction in an attempt to push the other one back. Neither side was able to push another back and as a result, the frontlines had temporarily stabilized.

Both sides had exhausted themselves in those battles. In particular, the German 68th Infantry Division, which participated in a counter-attack near the railway junction, had suffered significant losses.  Within days, the strength of its 188th regiment had declined from 1,302 troops to 277, the strength of its 196th regiment had declined from 1,285 troops to 887, the strength of the 169th regiment had declined from 1,155 troops to 537, while the strength of the sapper battalion had declined from 444 troops 284.

Soviet plans redefined 
While the battle of the Tarnopol-Proskurov railroad was taking place, the STAVKA needed to clarify the goals and take additional measures to concentrate forces and assets on the direction of the main attack. On 10 March, the Military Council of the 1st Ukrainian Front presented to the Headquarters considerations for the further conduct of the operation.

The most significant moments of the refined plan of operation were the following:
 A clearer targeting of both the right and left wings of the front at the encirclement and destruction of the German forces in the area north of the Dniester River
 The intention not only to advance to the Dniester river but also to develop the offensive in both to the south and the southwest until the Soviet border was reached
 The inclusion in the composition of the shock group of the front of the fresh 1st Tank Army, reinforcing the 60th Army with the 106th Rifle Corps (two divisions) and two more divisions from the reserve, reinforcing the 1st Guards Army with the 47th Rifle Corps (two divisions), the gradual withdrawal of the 3rd Guards Tank Army to the second echelon of the front for replenishment to take part in the future advances
 Targeting the right wing of the 2nd Ukrainian Front for an offensive towards Mohyliv-Podilskyi and along the southern bank of the Dniester, with the aim of assisting the 1st Ukrainian Front in the encirclement of the 1st Panzer Army

In accordance with the instructions of the Stavka, the commander of the 1st Ukrainian Front, Zhukov, on 13 March set new tasks for the 1st Ukrainian Front.

The 13th Army received the task to launch an offensive operation and seize Berestechko, Brody, Dubno and Zaliztsi areas.

The 60th Army was to seize Ternopil and reach the line of Ozerna, Zolotniki.

The 1st Guards Army was ordered to concentrate the main efforts on the right flank, in cooperation with the 3rd Guards Tank Army, to free Khmelnytskyi, and develop an offensive towards Yarmolyntsi, Chortkiv.

The 1st and 4th Tank armies were planned to be introduced into battle in the 60th Army's sector, with the 1st Tank Army being ordered to develop an attack in the direction of Chortkiv, Chernivtsi, while the 4th Tank Army would advance towards Kamianets-Podilskyi.

The 18th and 38th armies received the task of seizing Vinnytsia and Zhmerynka and then to advance towards Kamianets-Podilskyi.

Secondary fronts: Dubno-Brody and Vinnitsa-Zhmerinka 
After Soviets redefined their plans, the armies located on secondary fronts launched a series of attacks against the flanks of the 4th and 1st Panzer Armies. On 15 March, the troops of the Soviet 13th Army launched an offensive, striking one blow from the Torgovitsa area towards Brody with the forces of the 27th Rifle, 1st and 6th Guards Cavalry and 25th Tank Corps, and striking another blow from the region west of Shumsk towards Kremenets, Brody with the forces of the 24th Rifle Corps. On the very first day, in the area of the 27th Rifle Corps, the 25th Tank and 1st Guards Cavalry Corps were brought into battle, and on 16 March the 6th Guards Cavalry Corps joined the action as well. The Soviet troops crossed the Ikva river and rushed into the depths of the German defense, bypassing the strong Dubno stronghold from the north and south.
The German 13th Army Corps fiercely resisted the Soviet troops on the approaches to Dubno. The Soviet formations bypassed Dubno from the north, thereby threatening the rear of the German troops. At the same time, units of the Soviet 172nd Infantry Division and the 149th Infantry Division broke into the outskirts of the city from the east. Under the onslaught of the Soviet troops, the German 13th Army Corps, fearing encirclement, began to hastily retreat. On 17 March, the Soviet units had captured the city of Dubno - an important strong point of the Germans in the Lviv direction.

Around the same time that the battle of Dubno took place, the troops of the Soviet 24th Rifle Corps reached the approaches to the city of Kremenets, located on the Kremenets Mountains. Numerous bunker trenches, machine-gun emplacements, as well as other engineering structures turned Kremenets into a stronghold, where the Germans intended to stubbornly resist. The Soviet 350th Infantry Division bypassed Kremenets, cutting off roads leading to the city from the south, while the 107th Infantry Division bypassed the city from the north. At the same time, the units of the 287th Rifle Division attacked the city from the front. Acting in small groups, the Soviet troops infiltrated the German positions. On 19 March, the Soviet troops liberated Kremenets, defeating the German garrison defending it.

After the liberation of Dubno and Kremenets, the troops of the Soviet 13th Army continued to develop the offensive to the west and south-west, and by 20 March had reached the outskirts of Brody. Fierce battle broke out here with varying success. The Germans reinforced the 13th Army Corps with the 361st Infantry Division, which arrived from OKH reserve in Denmark. On 17 March, this division approached the Brody area, where it occupied the prepared lines of defense. The Korpsabteilung C, which included battle groups of three infantry divisions, also reinforced this sector. Eventually, the Germans managed to keep Brody in their hands and they stopped the advance of Soviet troops on the outskirts of it. Both, the 13th Army Corps and the Korpsabteilung C will eventually be completely destroyed in the Brody Pocket during the Soviet July 1944 Lvov–Sandomierz operation.

In general, the troops of the Soviet 13th Army, advancing on a front of about 120 km, advanced 20–80 km in five days and captured the major strongholds of the Germans- Dubno, Kremenets, Chervonoarmeysk, Torchin, Berestechko and others. They not only tied down the German 13th Army Corps (up to 6 divisions, of which 1 was a panzer division) and covered the right flank of the front attack force, but also absorbed one German infantry division that came from the OKH reserve, which eased the offensive of the 60th Army.

Meanwhile, on the left wing of the 1st Ukrainian Front, the troops of the 18th and 38th Armies persistently moved forward, taking one stronghold and large settlement after another. The troops of the 18th Army on 10 March had captured the town of Khmilnyk and developed the offensive in the direction of Dunaivtsi. Meanwhile, the 38th Army had to cross the Southern Bug river and seize such powerful centers of German resistance as Vinnytsia, Zhmerynka, and others.

On 16 March, units of the Soviet 151st Rifle Division of the 38th Army reached the approaches to Zhmerynka, turned by the Germans into a powerful center of resistance. To the north and south of the city, the 100th and 237th Rifle Divisions of the 67th Rifle Corps were advancing. Approaches to the city were mined by the Germans who created numerous strong-points with machine-gun emplacements. On the night before the attack, the Soviet sappers made passages in the minefields under heavy fire after reconnoitering the location of them. Along these aisles, at dawn, the Soviet infantry broke into Zhmerynka from the east. At the same time, other parts bypassed the city, striking at the German garrison from the flank and rear. By 18 March, Zhmerynka was completely liberated.

With the liberation of Zhmerynka, the Soviet troops began closing in on Vinnytsia, which was a place where the headquarters of Erich von Manstein's Army Group South was located. Parts of the Soviet 183rd Infantry Division advanced on Vinnitsa from the east with great difficulty through the impassable mud, while facing heavy German resistance. Having broken the resistance of the Germans at the railway embankment, the Soviet units infiltrated into the eastern part of the city in small groups and as a result of stubborn fighting by noon on 17 March they knocked the Germans out of it. The Germans, defeated in the eastern part of the city, retreated to the Southern Bug river. Hoping to stay in the western part of the city, the Germans blew up the river crossings across the Southern Bug and prepared for stubborn defense.

The commander of the 38th Army, Colonel-General Kirill Moskalenko, ordered to cross the Southern Bug river north and south of Vinnytsia, and then ordered to attack the flanks of the German forces that defended the city. At dawn on 17 March, the Germans attempted to push back the Soviet units from the river, but it was too late- the Soviets already had two battalions on the western bank of the river. Artillery and mortars were also transported there. When German forces attempted to eradicate the Soviet bridgehead, they were met by Soviet fire from all types of weapons.

Having repelled the German counterattack, units of the Soviet 305th Rifle Division, supported by artillery fire, began to advance and soon reached the Lukashevka area (20 km west of Vinnytsia), cutting off the Vinnitsa–Khmelnytskyi highway. Meanwhile, units of the 221st Rifle Division crossed the Southern Bug south of Vinnitsa and captured the village of Shkurintsy (12 km south-west of Vinnitsa). Now, the German forces defending Vinnitsa faced the threat of encirclement from both flanks, but continued to resist stubbornly. Then, the Soviet 183rd Infantry Division and the 241st Infantry Division increased the pressure on the Germans.

On 19 March, the battalion of the Soviet 183rd Infantry Division crossed the Southern Bug directly into Vinnitsa itself and occupied the suburb of Sadki. As a result of intense fighting in the morning of 20 March, the Soviet troops had completely liberated Vinnitsa. After the liberation of Zhmerynka and Vinnytsia, the troops of the Soviet 38th and 18th armies developed an offensive to the west and south-west, pushing the German 1st Panzer Army back to the Dniester river.

2nd phase of the operation. 21 March- 17 April 1944 
On March 21, the main strike force of the 1st Ukrainian Front resumed the attack, striking from the line of Volochysk, Cherny Ostrov towards Chortkiv. Chernivtsi. The troops of the 60th and 1st Guards Armies, with the assistance of the 4th, 1st, and 3rd Guards Tank Armies, shattered German defenses on the very first day. With a swift blow the Soviets tore open the front of the 4th Panzer Army and began to rapidly advance southwards.

Katukov's tank army moves south beyond Dniester River 
The STAVKA deeming it necessary to deny the 1st Panzer Army any chance of retreat south behind the Dniester River, the Soviet 1st Tank Army, led by Katukov, was ordered to advance beyond the Dniester, deep into the German rear areas.

The advance of the freshly introduced Katukov's 1st Tank Army was particularly successful. Already on the morning of 23 March, this tank army captured the important communication center of Chortkiv and at 10 AM on 24 March its 8th Guards Mechanized Corps reached the Dniester River. In the Zalishchyky district, the 20th Guards Mechanized Brigade of Colonel Babadzhanian approached the Dniester, and in the Stechko District (20 km north-west of Zalishchyky), the 1st Guards Tank Brigade of Colonel Gorelov and the 21st Guards Mechanised Brigade of Colonel Yakovlev approached the Dniester as well. To the left of those forces, the 11th Guards Tank Corps of Lieutenant General Getman reached the Dniester and crossed it from the march. Behind the mechanized and tank corps, the units of the Soviet 11th Rifle Corps of Major-General Zamertsev were moving forward.

The sky above the Dniester was blazing with rockets, flashes of shots, exploding shells and aerial bombs. On the muddy roads, through deep gullies and ravines to the south and southwest, the Soviet forces moved swiftly. Despite the deep spring mud and fierce resistance, the Germans were unable to stop the advance of the Soviet troops.

Among the first ones to cross the Dniester was the 64th Guards Separate Heavy Tank Brigade of Lieutenant Colonel Boyko, belonging to Katukov's 1st Tank Army. Quickly, the unit crossed the land between the Dniester and Prut rivers and by 11 PM on 25 March had seized the railway station Moshi, coming from the north to the approaches of Chernovtsy. When the Red Army reached the station, the train with German tanks was unloaded in a hurry. The sudden appearance of Soviet tanks caused confusion among the Germans. With a few shots, the Soviet tank crews set fire on the German ammunition wagons, which further exacerbated the panic. Then, the Soviet tankers struck a decisive blow, and the railway station was soon cleared.

Bridges on the river Prut, which led to Chernovtsy, were mined and defended by a strong group of the German forces. The attempts of Soviet tank crews to seize the bridges were unsuccessful. The then Soviets organized a reconnaissance in force across the river. At 5 pm on 28 March, the 64th Guards Tank Brigade began to cross the Prut in the Kalanchak area (5 km east of Chernovtsy) to strike at Chernovtsy from the east. At the same time, the 45th Guards Tank Brigade and the 24th Infantry Division began to cross the river in the area of Lenkovtsy (2 km north-west of Chernovtsy), bypassing Chernovtsy from the west.

In an effort to at least temporarily delay the advance of the Soviet troops, the German command decided to use aircraft. At Chernovtsy airfield, about 40 German planes were preparing to take off. However, the Soviet tanks unexpectedly broke through to the airfield and no aircraft could take off. The last attempt of the Germans to resist the Soviet troops crossing the Prut was thwarted.

Meanwhile, other parts of the 1st Tank Army bypassed Chernovtsy from the west, cutting off the German escape route to Storozhynets. The Germans, operating in the Chernovtsy region, were under the threat of encirclement. To avoid that, the Germans began a hasty retreat, which turned it into a costly process. During the retreat, they were attacked by the Ilyushin Il-2 Sturmovik Ground Attack Aircraft of the 227th Assault Aviation Division of Colonel Lozhechnikov.

At noon on 29 March, Chernivtsi, the regional center of Ukraine, was completely cleared from the German forces. Similarly, on 28 March, units of the 1st Guards Tank Brigade cleared the German forces from around Kolomyia. To attack the Germans in the city, an advanced detachment was assigned of 7 T-34 tanks with tank riders on them. At dawn on 28 March, an advanced detachment attacked the city from the northeast, and a platoon of tanks that approached attacked the city from the northwest. German resistance was broken. Soviet units broke into Kolomyia and by 9 AM had completely cleared it. In the city and at the station, the Soviets captured large trophies: more than a dozen serviceable tanks, 13 trains, several steam locomotives, 400 cars and 10 different warehouses.

After the capture of Chernivtsi and Kolomyia, the troops of the 1st Tank Army continued active operations in the direction of Ivano-Frankivsk and Nadvirna. After defeating the Germans in the foothills of the Carpathians, on 8 April, army units reached the Soviet border at a front of over 200 km.

All told, in the course of 2 weeks, the 1st Tank Army successfully advanced over 170 km through the spring mud and numerous water barriers, like the Dniester river. This tank army was highly successfully in advancing beyond the Dniester, forcing the Germans to abandon one major city after another. However, this also meant that Katukov's 1st Tank Army was effectively excluded from the attempts to split and destroy the 1st Panzer Army around Kamianets-Podilskyi.

For its accomplishments during this operation, Katukov's 1st Tank Army was awarded the status of the 1st "Guards" Tank Army.

The encirclement of the 1st Panzer Army

The troops of the 1st Guards Army, regrouping their main forces on the right flank, together with units of the 3rd Guards Tank Army, struck north-west of Khmelnytskyi. On 22 March, the German resistance was broken and Soviet troops deeply enveloped the German forces around Proskurov from the west.

At the same time, the formations of the 107th Rifle Corps of the 1st Guards Army attacked the Germans defending Proskurov from the north and northeast. On 25 March, Proskurov (now Khmelnitsky) was cleared from the German forces by units of the 127th Infantry Division, the 304th Infantry Division and the 2nd Guards Airborne Division.

The 4th Tank Army, which was developing the success of the breakthrough from the Volochysk region to the south, was also successful. On 26 March, this tank army broke into Kamianets-Podilskyi and freed it from the Germans.

After the capture of Proskurov, the 1st Guards Army continued the offensive in a southwestern direction, seeking, using the success of the 1st and 4th Tank Armies, to quickly reach the Kamenets-Podolsky area and stand on the retreat paths of the 1st Panzer Army. The Soviet 3rd Guards Tank Army was then withdrawn to the front reserve on March 28. By the end of 30 March, the 1st Guards Army reached the region of Chemerovtsy.

By this point, several major re-groupings took place. The 11th Rifle Corps (three divisions) of the 1st Guards Army was reassigned to Katukov's 1st Tank Army and acted together with it in the foothills of the Carpathians; On 27 March, the 30th Rifle Corps (two divisions) was also subordinated to the 4th Tank Army and operated in the Kamenets-Podolsky area. But the 1st Guards Army was given another corps- the 18th Guards Rifle Corps (two divisions), which was transferred to it from the 60th Army on 22 March and was at that time 100 km from the main army forces. The decision of the front commander Zhukov to transfer the 18th Guards Rifle Corps from the 60th Army (with which it formed a common external front) to the 1st Guards Army, from which it was torn off, was a miscalculation that played a negative role in the subsequent.attempt to destroy the 1st Panzer Army.

Thus, with a powerful strike from the Volochysk, Chornyi Ostriv areas to the south and south-west, the troops of the 1st and the 4th Tank Armies, the 18th, 38th, 60th and the 1st Guards Armies of the 1st Ukrainian Front tore a huge gap in the German defense and had split the front of Army Group South into two parts- its 4th Panzer Army was driven back to the west and part of the forces of this army was surrounded on 24 March in Ternopil that was declared to be a fortress (Festung), while the 1st Panzer Army was enveloped from the south-west by the Soviet 4th Tank Army.

At this time, Marshal Konev's 2nd Ukrainian Front, having struck from Zvenyhorodka to Uman, launched the neighboring Uman–Botoshany operation. They successfully broke through the German defenses, split the German front in fierce battles and rushed to the Dniester, deeply enveloping the left flank of the 1st Panzer Army. The Soviet 40th Army, advancing on the right wing of the front, on 21 March advanced to the Dniester north-east of Mogilev-Podolsky with advanced units, and then, having sent the main forces to the opposite bank of the river, began to develop an offensive in the general direction towards Khotyn.

Thus, as a result of coordinated actions of the troops of the 1st and 2nd Ukrainian fronts, the entire 1st Panzer Army, numbering approximately 200,000 troops and consisting of 10 infantry, 9 panzer and panzer-grenadier, 1 artillery division, as well as various tank, artillery and engineering units, was by 30 March encircled by the troops of the 4th Tank, 1st Guards, 18th, 38th and 40th Combined Arms Armies in the area of Chemerivtsi, Dunaivtsi, Studenitsa, Kamianets-Podilskyi. The length of the front line around the German forces, which were squeezed in this area, was about 150 km.

While the encircled forces had food and ammunition enough to support them for over two weeks, the vehicles were extremely low on fuel. Hube had ordered all service units south of the Dniester to withdraw away from the main Red Army penetration which were taking place to the south on the 2nd Ukrainian Front's 40th Army front. Zhukov believed Hube would attempt to breakout to the south. To prevent this, he stripped units from the encircling forces and sent them to reinforce the south side of the pocket.

Hube organizes move west
Hans-Valentin Hube, the commander of the 1st Panzer Army, now ordered the pocket to be reduced in size, shortening the position's lines to increase defence density. As the 1st Ukrainian Front prepared to complete the encirclement Hube requested the authorization to use mobile defence tactics, a request which was quickly denied. However, once the encirclement was complete, the situation changed. Manstein had been arguing with Hitler for the trapped Army to be allowed to attempt a breakout, and for a relief force to be sent to assist them. With the loss of the entire Panzer army in the balance, Hitler finally gave in and ordered Hube to attempt a breakout.

Though supplies were still being brought in, they were insufficient to maintain the Army's fighting strength.

Moving west would mean fighting through the Soviet armoured forces that created the breach and crossing a number of rivers. Hube preferred to head south, over the Dniester. Manstein believed that this is what the Soviet command expected, and would be the most heavily resisted line of escape. Also, such a move would push the 1st Panzer Army into Romania, making defending the southern Ukraine sector quite difficult. The Hungarian VII Corps was holding a sector of the front to the west of the Kamianets-Podilskyi pocket. Manstein ordered Hube to break out to this area.

The threat of panic among his troops within the pocket was a grave concern. As a means of maintaining control and simplifying the chain of command, Hube consolidated his forces into provisional corps groups. Each corps group, within its zone, was to be responsible for both the conduct of the attack to the west and the rear guard action in the east. The armored divisions of each corps group were to spearhead the army's attack, while the infantry divisions covered the rear. Two columns would fight their way west. The northern column was Korpsgruppe von der Chevallerie under command of Kurt von der Chevallerie and the south column was Korpsgruppe Breith under command of General Hermann Breith. A third corps under command of General Hans Gollnick of the XLVI Panzer Corps formed Korpsgruppe Gollnick.

The first objective of the breakout was to be the capture of crossing sites over the Zbruch River. Corps Group Chevallerie was to establish contact with the 1st Panzer Division at Gorodok and Task Force Mauss in the area between the Ushitsa and Zbruch Rivers. It was then to cover the northern flank of the army between the Ushitsa and Zbruch Rivers and establish a bridgehead across the latter at Skala. Corps Group Breith was to recapture Kamianets-Podilskyi, regain control of the Kamianets–Khotyn road, and establish a bridgehead across the Zbruch River northwest of Khotin. Task Force Gollnick, in close contact with the south flank of Corps Group Breith, was to delay the Soviets below the Dnestr River and was to retire to and hold a bridgehead at Khotin.

Hube's Army was to break out northwest toward Tarnopol, where relief forces from Paul Hausser′s II SS Panzer Corps were to meet them. Air Supply Arrangements were made with the German Fourth Air Fleet to assemble five air transport groups and a number of bomber wings at L'vev in Poland to fly essential supplies into the pocket. In addition, he believed the Soviets would act as they had at Stalingrad, and make their strongest resistance along this line.

Weakness of the Soviet encirclement front 
Although the Soviets now had encircled the 1st Panzer Army, there were weaknesses in the Soviet encirclement front. In the western direction, between the right flank of the 1st Guards Army in the region of Chemerovtsy, and the left flank of the 4th Tank Army in the Lyantskoruni region, there was a gap of up to 15 km. The 4th Tank Army, which formed the south-western part of the encirclement front, suffered significant losses and had just 60 operational tanks left. The 30th Rifle Corps (two divisions), transferred to the 4th Tank Army from the 1st Guards Army for reinforcement, had very little artillery and, moreover, was forced to be deployed at the line indicated to it already in the course of repelling strong German attacks. The 4th Tank Army and the 30th Rifle Corps experienced an acute shortage of ammunition and fuel, which were delivered only by air.

Thus, although the Soviet troops managed to cut off large amount of German forces and push them back into a relatively small area north of Kamianets-Podilskyi, the conditions for the destruction of the German troops were not created. Both the internal and the external fronts were vulnerable and in the most important places. Red Army troops, operating on the inner front, somewhat outnumbered the 1st Panzer Army but did not have enough artillery, especially tanks. The combined-arms armies, which advanced through difficult terrain and had great difficulty in towing their artillery through the deep spring mud, did not possess sufficient striking force for decisive actions to dismember the German grouping, which had a large number of panzer divisions. The 4th Tank Army, significantly weakened and experiencing great difficulties in ammunition and fuel supplies, barely repulsed the German attacks.

For the destruction of the 1st Panzer Army, the Soviet 1st Tank Army, led by Katukov, could be used, but it went far ahead and acted on a broad front south of the Dniester river in the foothills of the Carpathians. Furthermore, the Soviets also transferred part of the rifle divisions behind the Dniester as well, to assist Katukov's 1st Tank Army in the rout of German forces from Chernovtsy, near the Soviet border. As a result, the only Soviet force that was still capable to inflict a decisive strike against the 1st Panzer Army, was effectively excluded from the attempts to destroy it, as it pursued other operational goals, namely to deny the 1st Panzer Army chance of retreating south in the areas behind the Dniester river,  which were highly successful.

Under these circumstances, the Soviet front command decided to intercept the German withdrawal paths and destroy it with blows from all sides. However, the front command did not accurately determine the direction of the breakthrough of the Germans. At first, it believed that the 1st Panzer Army would make its way south through the Dniester, to Romania. This assumption was based on some intelligence data.

The command of the 1st Ukrainian Front, which believed that the enemy would retreat south, directed the main efforts of the troops in late March to cut off the Germans from the crossings on the Dniester and capture them. Persistent German attacks in the western direction and the fact that the Soviet 4th Tank Army held back attacks with great difficulty were seen as the German desire to "seep out" to Dniester crossings near Zalishchyky.

Breakout

On 27 March, the advance guard of the 1st Panzer Army moved west toward the Zbruch river, while the rearguard began a fighting withdrawal, with the rest of the 220,000 men between them. The advanced guard attack went well for the German forces. The northern column quickly captured three bridges over the Zbruch River, while the southern column was battered by a Red Army's 4th Tank Army counterattack which penetrated deep into the pocket, capturing Kamianets-Podilskyi. The loss of this major road and rail hub meant that the escaping Germans had to detour around the city, slowing the movement to a crawl. A counterattack soon cut off the Russians in the city, and the breakout recommenced. Moving by day and night, the kessel kept moving. Soon bridgeheads were formed over the Seret river.

While Hube's army escaped west, Zhukov and Konev continued to believe that the major breakout attempt would be to the south. He ordered the attacks on the north and eastern flanks of the pocket stepped up. These attacks achieved little, and many fell on positions which had been abandoned as the German troops withdrew to Proskurov. Despite the attacks to the West, the Red Army kept increasing troop density to the southern flank of the pocket in anticipation of an attack that would never come.

On 30 March, Manstein was informed by the OKH that he had been relieved of command.

The next day, the Red Army began to react. A strong armored force from the 4th Tank Army launched an assault in the north between the Seret and Zbruch. Hube's southern advanced guard turned and halted the Red Army assault, severing its supply lines and rendering the T-34s of the 4th Tank Army immobile. Despite the fact that he was now taking the breakout attempt seriously, Zhukov did not move to block the escaping Germans. The way to Tarnopol was still open.

Completing the breakout
Despite heavy snowfalls, low supplies, and encirclement, the constant movement of Hube's Army meant that "pocket fever" did not set in. The troops were still moving in good order and obeying discipline, while desertions were few. This was a stark comparison to the panicked situation within the Stalingrad and Korsun encirclements.

By 5 April, the advanced guards of both the northern and southern columns had reached the Strypa River, and on the 6th, near the town of Buchach, they linked up with the probing reconnaissance elements of Hausser's SS Divisions.

In over two weeks of heavy combat and during horrid weather, the majority of the 1st Panzer Army had managed to escape the encirclement at the cost of losing almost the entire heavy equipment, with only 45 armored vehicles escaping, while many divisions ended up being shattered formations. As a result, the 1st Panzer Army required thorough refitting.

The Army was put back into the line and established itself between the Dniester and the town of Brody.

German losses during the encirclement 
Just how much exactly did Hube's 1st Panzer Army lost during the encirclement is unknown. However, it is clear that the equipment losses were exceptionally high, as hundreds of precious tanks, assault guns and trucks were lost principally through their abandonment in the mud, while tangible losses were sustained in manpower as well.

For example, by the end of the breakout operation, the 19th Panzer Division no longer had any operational tanks left, the 20th Panzer-Grenadier Division had 1 StuG left. Meanwhile, the 6th Panzer Division had only 2 Panthers left, the 17th Panzer Division had 1 Panzer IV left, while the 509th Heavy Panzer Battalion had only 1 Tiger tank left.

According to Soviet reports, the 1st Ukrainian Front between 21 and 31 March 1944 had captured 353 tanks, 26,147 trucks and auto-cars, 138 self-propelled guns, 184 armored personnel carriers, 1 armored train, 2,500 machine guns, 30,742 rifles and sub-machine guns. Between 1–10 April 1944, the Soviets had captured an additional 185 tanks, 2 self-propelled guns, 61 plane, 121 artillery guns, 7,483 trucks and auto-cars. Although the amount of  captured German tanks and self-propelled guns is likely to be overstated, it nonetheless shows a very grim reality that Hube's forces lost huge amounts of equipment.

Tangible losses were suffered in manpower as well. According to the German reports, between 23 March- 8 April 1944, the 1st Panzer Army suffered a total of 14,242 losses. However, this number is incomplete and under-reported due to the fact that several divisions alone had sustained greater losses than this. In addition, the losses of the rear units were most likely not included in initial reports.

For example, the 96th Infantry Division had a strength of 12,487 troops on 1 March 1944, which had decreased to just 3,000 troops by 4 April 1944, while the strength of the 291st Infantry Division had fallen from 16,175 troops on 1 March to 8,000 troops by 4 April. As seen from the table below, similar decline in manpower strength can be seen in other German divisions as well.

Furthermore, according to the reports of the 1st Ukrainian Front, just between 21 and 31 March 1944 alone, the Soviets had captured 14,549 German soldiers and officers, which exceeds the total losses suffered by the 1st Panzer Army that are listed in German reports.

Due to heavy losses, the 82nd Infantry Division was disbanded, while the 1st SS Panzer Division Leibstandarte SS Adolf Hitler, 6th, 11th, 19th and 25th Panzer Divisions were so badly damaged that they were withdrawn from the front and sent to the West for extensive refits. Furthermore, the 75th, 371st Infantry Divisions and the 18th Artillery Division were categorized as "Kampfgruppen", or battle groups, meaning that they were so depleted as to actually be the equivalent of little more than reinforced regiments. Meanwhile, the 1st Panzer, 68th, 96th and 208th Infantry Divisions were left with just the remnants of their troops, while the 291st Infantry Division suffered 50% losses in personnel. In addition, the 357th and 359th Infantry Divisions, which were not a part of the Hube Pocket, but had participated in a month long battle as a whole, were left with just remnants of their troops- at the start of April 1944, the 357th and 359 Infantry Divisions had a strength of 1,859 and 1,863 troops respectively.

Regarding the general condition of Hube troops after the breakout there is a following report:

"The state of the personnel and military equipment of the 1st, 68th, 75th, 82nd, 96th, 254th, 291st Infantry Divisions, 18th Artillery Division, battle group of the 1st SS Panzer Division Leibstandarte SS Adolf Hitler and 11th Panzer Division makes them not combat-ready. Due to the loss of heavy equipment, artillery towing vehicles, rear service equipment, as well as a small number of combat personnel, the remaining divisions are also only partially operational".

All told, during the Soviet "Proskurov-Chernovtsy Operation", which lasted from 4 March to 17 April 1944, at least 16 German divisions were either destroyed, disbanded due to heavy losses or required major rebuilding. Whatever their precise number, it is clear that the combined German manpower and equipment losses were devastating and had further eroded the personnel strengths of German formations that already had been badly depleted by months of continuous combat.

Order of battle for 1st Panzer Army, March 1944
1st Panzer Army (Generaloberst Hans-Valentin Hube)
1st Panzer Division (Generalleutnant Werner Marcks)
17th Panzer Division (Generalleutnant Karl-Friedrich von der Meden)
III Panzer Corps (General der Panzertruppe Hermann Breith)
16th Panzer Division (Generalmajor Hans-Ulrich Back)
11th Panzer Division (Generalleutnant Wend von Wietersheim)
Kampfgruppe from 1st SS Panzer Division Leibstandarte SS Adolf Hitler
249th StuG Brigade
Heavy Tank Regiment Bäke (Oberst Franz Bäke)
509th Heavy Panzer Battalion (Oberleutnant Dr. König)
LIX Army Corps (General der Infanterie Kurt von der Chevallerie)
96th Infantry Division (Generalleutnant Richard Wirtz)
291st Infantry Division (Generalmajor Oskar Eckholt)
6th Panzer Division (Generalleutnant Walter Denkert)
19th Panzer Division (Generalleutnant Hans Källner)
2nd SS Panzer Division Das Reich - Kampfgruppe (SS-Sturmbannführer Otto Weidinger)
276th StuG Brigade
280th StuG Brigade
616th Heavy Panzerjäger Battalion
88th Heavy Panzerjäger Battalion
509th Heavy Panzerjäger Battalion
XXIV Panzer Corps (General der Panzertruppen Walther Nehring)
25th Panzer Division (remnants) (Generalleutnant Hans Tröger)
20th Panzergrenadier Division (General der Panzertruppen Georg Jauer)
168th Infantry Division (Generalleutnant Werner Schmidt-Hammer)
208th Infantry Division (Generalleutnant Heinz Piekenbrock)
371st Infantry Division (General der Infanterie Hermann Niehoff)
300th StuG Brigade
731st Heavy Panzerjäger Battalion
473rd Motorcycle Battalion
XXXXVI Panzer Corps (General der Infanterie Friedrich Schulz)
1st Infantry Division (Generalleutnant Ernst-Anton von Krosigk)
82nd Infantry Division (Generalleutnant Hans-Walter Heyne)
75th Infantry Division (Generalleutnant Helmuth Beukemann)
254th Infantry Division (Generalleutnant Alfred Thielmann)
101st Jäger Division (General der Gebirgstruppen Emil Vogel)
18th Artillery Division (General der Artillerie Karl Thoholte)
300th StuG Battalion

References
Citations

Bibliography
Glantz, David, Soviet Military Deception in the Second World War, Frank Cass, London, (1989) 
Alan Clark, Barbarossa, Harper Perennial, New York, 1985 
John Erickson, The Road To Berlin: Stalin's War With Germany Vol.2, WESTVIEW PRESS, London, 1983
Gregory Liedtke (2015). Lost in the Mud: The (Nearly) Forgotten Collapse of the German Army in the Western Ukraine, March and April 1944. The Journal of Slavic Military Studies
 
Perry Moore (Design), Warren Kingsley, C. Rawling (Development), Against the Odds: KesselSchlacht (Ukraine Spring 1944), LPS, 2002
Bryan Perrett, Knights of the Black Cross: Hitler's Panzerwaffe and Its Leaders.
Carl Wagener, Der Ausbruch der 1. Panzerarmee aus dem Kessel von Kamenez-Podolsk März/April 1944.
Encirclement of a Panzer Army Near Kamenets-Podolskiy (chapter 6 of Operations of Encircled Forces, United States Department of the Army).
Алексей Исаев. "Котёл" Хубе. Проскуровско-Черновицкая Операция 1944 года. Яуза, 2017
Грылев А.Н. Днепр-Карпаты-Крым. Освобождение Правобережной Украины и Крыма в 1944 году. Москва: Наука, 1970

Conflicts in 1944
Kamianets-Podilskyi
Military operations of World War II involving Germany
Battles and operations of the Soviet–German War
Encirclements in World War II